Convenience Retail Asia Limited (CRA) is a Hong Kong retailer which owns bakeries (Saint Honore Cake Shop, Bread Boutique) in Hong Kong, Macau and Mainland China. It previously owned the Hong Kong franchise for convenience store chain Circle K, but sold the chain to the franchise owner in late 2020.

The company was established in 1985 and is headquartered in Hong Kong. It is a subsidiary of Fung Group, one of the largest retailers in Hong Kong.

The company was listed on the Growth Enterprise Market board (stock code: 8052) of Hong Kong Stock Exchange. The company subsequently transferred its listing to the Main Board of the Stock Exchange of Hong Kong (stock code: 831) in June 2011.

Link
Convenience Retail Asia Limited

References

Li & Fung
Companies listed on the Hong Kong Stock Exchange
Retail companies established in 1985
Retail companies of Hong Kong
1985 establishments in Hong Kong